Aitor Elizegi Alberdi (born 27 June 1966) is a Spanish entrepreneur, chef and the president of football club Athletic Bilbao from 2018 to 2022.

Biography
Born in 1966, in Santutxu, Bilbao, Elizegi grew up supporting Athletic Bilbao, becoming a member of the club at the age of 25. Elizegi entered the culinary industry in 1987, winning the Spanish Chefs Championship a year later and the Basque Gastronomy Award in 2000 for best restaurateur at his Gaminiz restaurant. As of 2019, Elizegi is head of a number of Basque restaurants in Bilbao, including Txocook, Bascook and Basquery.

On 27 December 2018, Elizegi won Athletic Bilbao's presidential election to succeeding former incumbent Josu Urrutia, defeating Alberto Uribe-Echevarría, treasurer under Urrutia, by a margin of just 85 votes.

One of his first acts as president was to replace the long-serving sporting director José María Amorrortu with 
Rafael Alkorta and Andoni Ayarza, (both former players of the club), as promised in his election campaign.

He did not seek re-election at the end of his four-year term in 2022, with Jon Uriarte appointed to succeed him.

Politics
Elizegi is a member of the Basque Nationalist Party. Elizegi is a Basque nationalist and independentist, and has expressed a desire for the admittance of a Basque national football team into UEFA.

Notes

References

1966 births
Living people
People from Bilbao
Athletic Bilbao presidents
Spanish businesspeople
Spanish chefs
Basque nationalists
Basque cuisine
Businesspeople from the Basque Country (autonomous community)